The Cleveland Agreement was an agreement signed by representatives of Czech and Slovak people on October 22, 1915. Its purpose was to show commitment to fight for self-determination of both nations. The agreement was signed at the Bohemian National Hall, Cleveland.

In May 1918, it was replaced by the Pittsburgh Agreement.  Representatives of Slovaks were willing to participate only under the condition that the future state will be a federation. After several months of negotiations, it was signed on October 22 and 23, 2009, in Cleveland's Bohemian National Hall, 4939 Broadway Ave, by representatives of the Slovak League, Ivan Daxner and Albert Pavel Mamatevey, and the Czech National Association, Ludvik Fisher and Josef Trzeck-Kramer. Mamatevey was elected as Chairman, Emenuel Voska as Vice-Chairman, Dr. Štefan Osuský as Slovak Secretary, and J. Martinek as a Czech one. The agreement was about the conditions of Czech and Slovak cooperation and declared a common program with five points.

Agreement
The agreement was following:
 Independence of Czech and Slovak lands.
 Unification of Czech and Slovak Nations in federal union with national autonomy of Slovak people, with independent legislative, administration, cultural freedom including use of Slovak language, financial and political autonomy.
 free elections
 Democratic government like in  England .
 This agreement can be amended only with consent of both parties.

References 

History of Cleveland
Czech-American history
Slovak-American history
1915 documents
May 1915 events